The Central District of Khoy County is in West Azerbaijan province, Iran. At the National Census in 2006, its population was 260,854 in 62,805 households. The following census in 2011 counted 288,565 people in 80,605 households. At the latest census in 2016, the district had 288,269 inhabitants in 85,342 households.

References 

Khoy County

Districts of West Azerbaijan Province

Populated places in West Azerbaijan Province

Populated places in Khoy County